William Clay Matthews Jr. (born March 15, 1956) is a former American football linebacker who played for the Cleveland Browns and the Atlanta Falcons of the National Football League (NFL). He was drafted in the first round by the Cleveland Browns and played in 278 games over 19 NFL seasons, which initially ranked him at number 17 among most games played (currently at number 21, see List of NFL players by games played). Matthews had 1,561 tackles in his career, unofficially the third most in NFL history trailing Jessie Tuggle and Ray Lewis.

He is the father of Clay Matthews III, an All-Pro linebacker and Super Bowl Champion, and Casey Matthews, a former American football linebacker; brother of Hall of Fame offensive lineman Bruce Matthews.

Early life and college 
Matthews was born into a football family. His father, Clay Matthews Sr., played for the NFL in the 1950s. Matthews graduated from New Trier East High School in Winnetka, Illinois, in 1974. Matthews and his brother Bruce both attended college at the University of Southern California (USC), where both played on the USC Trojans football team.

Professional career 
Matthews was drafted by the Cleveland Browns with the 12th pick in the first round of the 1978 NFL Draft. Matthews was a four-time selection for the Pro Bowl with the Browns and was a cornerstone of the defense for well over a decade. In 1984, Matthews recorded 12.0 sacks. He was present at some infamous Browns playoff losses during the 1980s, known as Red Right 88 (1981), The Drive (1987), and The Fumble (1988), which stopped those Browns teams from potentially advancing to the Super Bowl. One of his most memorable moments as a Brown was in a playoff game against the Bills on January 6, 1990. With only seconds left in the fourth quarter and the Bills at the Browns' 11-yard line, Matthews intercepted a pass (at the one-yard line) thrown by Bills quarterback Jim Kelly to seal a Cleveland victory. After the 1993 season, Matthews signed with the Atlanta Falcons. In 1995, at the age of 39, Matthews started all 16 games for the Falcons, and set a record as the oldest player to record a sack at the age of 40 years, 282 days.

Matthews was named the AFC Defensive Player of the Week twice on the Cleveland Browns (Week 12, 1984 and Week 9, 1991). Matthews and his son, Clay Matthews III, are the only father-son tandem to be named Defensive Player of the Week in the NFL.

Life after pro football
Matthews resides in Agoura Hills, California. He serves as defensive coordinator at Oaks Christian High School, a co-ed private school in Westlake Village, California which his son Casey attended. He was inducted into the USC Athletic Hall of Fame in 2005, along with his brother Bruce.  Matthews also opened a Pontiac car dealership in the Cleveland suburb of Euclid in 1992; it currently operates under new ownership as Sims Buick GMC.

Matthews and his brother Bruce competed with members of their family on the popular TV game show Family Feud, hosted by Richard Dawson. The Matthews family won the game, with Matthews being one of two family members to play in the final round. They ended the game with 41 points total but did not take the $10,000 grand prize.

In 2014, he was named Director of Football Operations at Carter High School (Tennessee), where he once served as an assistant coach.

Personal life

Matthews is married to Leslie Matthews. They have five children: Jennifer, Kyle, Brian, Clay III, and Casey. Clay III and Kyle played football at USC, while Casey was a linebacker for the Oregon Ducks football at the University of Oregon. Clay III was drafted by the Green Bay Packers in the 2009 NFL Draft, while Casey was drafted in Round 4 of the 2011 NFL Draft by the Philadelphia Eagles.

References

External links

`

1956 births
Living people
American football linebackers
Atlanta Falcons players
Cleveland Browns players
USC Trojans football players
High school football coaches in California
American Conference Pro Bowl players
All-American college football players
New Trier High School alumni
People from Euclid, Ohio
People from Winnetka, Illinois
Sportspeople from Palo Alto, California
Players of American football from California
Players of American football from Illinois
Matthews football family